This is the list of Greek Second Division top goalscorers by season.

1983-84
 Dimitris Tzeplidis of Edessaikos with 21 goals
 Andreas Anagnostou of Pierikos with 16 goals
 Christos Mesimerlis of Edessaikos with 15 goals

1984-85
 Kostas Paraskevopoulos of Almopos with 19 goals
 Ilias Vakoufaris of Agrotikos Asteras with 16 goals
 Giannis Papadopoulos of Edessaikos with 16 goals

1985-86
 Alekos Panagiotidis of Naoussa with 21 goals
 Kostas Vellios of Edessaikos with 17 goals
 Ilias Vakoufaris of Veria with 16 goals

1986-87
 Kostas Kottakis of Ionikos with 20 goals
 Nikos Kriezis of Skoda Xanthi with 17 goals
 Apostolos Drakopoulos of Panachaiki with 16 goals

1987-88
 Kostas Kottakis of Ionikos with 18 goals
 Dimitris Nolis of Kastoria with 17 goals
 Nikos Gambetas of Doxa Dramas with 15 goals

1988-89
 Achilleas Adamopoulos of Skoda Xanthi with 30 goals
 Vasilis Keramidas of PAS Giannina with 17 goals
 Dian Veliskov of Panserraikos with 15 goals

1989-90
 Alexandros Alexandris of Veria with 21 goals
 Giorgos Vaitsis of Panachaiki with 17 goals
 Michalis Chantabakis of Niki Volou with 17 goals

1990-91
 Alexandros Alexandris of Veria with 16 goals
 Nikos Tsoleridis of Apollon Kalamarias with 16 goals
 Androklis Konstantinidis of Atromitos with 15 goals

1991-92
 Dimitris Nolis of Apollon Kalamarias with 21 goals
 Michalis Alexiadis of Naoussa with 13 goals
 Vasilis Tsiartas of Naoussa with 13 goals

1992-93
 Kostas Tsanas of Levadiakos with 14 goals
Miroslav Zivkovic of Naoussa with 13 goals
 Predrag Mitic of Pontioi Veria with 12 goals

1993-94
 Zdenko Muf of PAS Giannina with 29 goals
 Predrag Mitic of Pontioi Veria with 16 goals
 Arjan Bellaj of PAS Giannina with 14 goals

1994-95
 Nikos Kakanoulias of Panargiakos with 17 goals
 Bogoljub Randjelovic of Pierikos with 17 goals
 Georgios Strantzalis of Paniliakos with 14 goals

1995-96
 Mohammad Nasser Afash of Proodeftiki with 17 goals
 Sasa Markovic of Panelefsiniakos with 15 goals
 Marios Sengos of Ialysos with 15 goals

1996-97
 Giannis Paflias of Niki Volou with 18 goals
 Isaak Almanidis of Proodeftiki with 16 goals
 Michalis Klokidis of Levadiakos with 15 goals

1997-98
 Davor Jakovljevic of Ethnikos Asteras with 35 goals
 Ademar of Panserraikos with 23 goals
 Theodoros Armylagos of Panelefsiniakos with 20 goals

1998-99
 Giorgos Kiourkos of Kallithea with 22 goals
 Miodrag Medan of PAS Giannina with 16 goals
 Milos Dabic of Lykoi with 14 goals

1999-00
 Giorgos Papandreou of Athinaikos with 24 goals
 Ademar of Panserraikos with 18 goals
 Karim Mouzaoui of Apollon Kalamarias with 17 goals

2000-01
 Thomas Makris of Egaleo with 16 goals
 Giorgos Zacharopoulos of Kallithea with 15 goals
 Lefteris Velentzas of Akratitos with 13 goals

2001-02
 Fanis Gekas of Kallithea with 14 goals
 Giorgos Zacharopoulos of Chalkidona with 12 goals
 Ioannis Lazanas of Patraikos with 10 goals

2002-03
 Giorgos Zacharopoulos of Chalkidona with 21 goals
 Giannis Thomaidis of Paniliakos with 15 goals
 Thomas Troupkos of Apollon Kalamarias with 15 goals

2003-04
 Cleyton of Apollon Kalamarias with 15 goals
 Formiga of Atromitos with 12 goals
 Sokratis Bountouris of Poseidon Neon Poron with 12 goals

2004-05
 Ilias Kabas of Ilisiakos with 18 goals
 Giorgos Saitiotis of Olympiakos Volou with 14 goals
 Ilias Manikas of Paniliakos with 14 goals

2005-06
  Patrick Ogunsoto of Ergotelis with 17 goals
 Ilias Kabas of Ilisiakos with 15 goals
 Giorgos Saitiotis of Niki Volou with 13 goals

2006-07
 Ilias Solakis of Kastoria with 21 goals
 Giorgos Saitiotis of PAS Giannina with 18 goals
 Ilias Kabas of Ilisiakos with 15 goals

2007-08
 Ilias Anastasakos of Thrasyvoulos with 18 goals
 Evangelos Kaounos of Kalamata with 15 goals
 Benjamin Onwuachi of Ionikos with 14 goals

Football League (Greece)